Euphorbia cyathophora, known by various names including dwarf poinsettia, fire-on-the-mountain, and paintedleaf, is native to North and South America and naturalized elsewhere. They belong to the Cyathium type of inflorescence. Here, the inflorescence axis is convex in shape.

References

External links

 New South Wales Flora Online

cyathophora
Flora of North America
Flora of South America